Nutation is a rocking, swaying, or nodding motion in the axis of rotation of a largely axially symmetric object, such as a gyroscope, planet, or bullet in flight, or as an intended behaviour of a mechanism. In an appropriate reference frame it can be defined as a change in the second Euler angle. If it is not caused by forces external to the body, it is called free nutation or Euler nutation. A pure nutation is a movement of a rotational axis such that the first Euler angle is constant. Therefore it can be seen that the circular red arrow in the diagram indicates the combined effects of precession and nutation, while nutation in the absence of precession would only change the tilt from vertical (second Euler angle). However, in spacecraft dynamics, precession (a change in the first Euler angle) is sometimes referred to as nutation.

In a rigid body

If a top is set at a tilt on a horizontal surface and spun rapidly, its rotational axis starts precessing about the vertical. After a short interval, the top settles into a motion in which each point on its rotation axis follows a circular path. The vertical force of gravity produces a horizontal torque  about the point of contact with the surface; the top rotates in the direction of this torque with an angular velocity  such that at any moment
       (vector cross product)

where  is the instantaneous angular momentum of the top.

Initially, however, there is no precession, and the upper part of the top falls sideways and downward, thereby tilting. This gives rise to an imbalance in torques that starts the precession. In falling, the top overshoots the amount of tilt at which it would precess steadily and then oscillates about this level. This oscillation is called nutation. If the motion is damped, the oscillations will die down until the motion is a steady precession.

The physics of nutation in tops and gyroscopes can be explored using the model of a heavy symmetrical top with its tip fixed. (A symmetrical top is one with rotational symmetry, or more generally one in which two of the three principal moments of inertia are equal.) Initially, the effect of friction is ignored. The motion of the top can be described by three Euler angles: the tilt angle  between the symmetry axis of the top and the vertical (second Euler angle); the azimuth  of the top about the vertical (first Euler angle); and the rotation angle  of the top about its own axis (third Euler angle).

If the top has mass  and its center of mass is at a distance  from the pivot point, its gravitational potential relative to the plane of the support is

Since we are taking a symmetric top, we have =. The kinetic energy is

In terms of the Euler angles, this is

The rate of precession is related to the tilt by

One of these is not related to a physical angle; the other two determine the upper and lower bounds on the tilt angle, between which the gyroscope oscillates.

Astronomy

The nutation of a planet occurs because the gravitational effects of other bodies cause the speed of its axial precession to vary over time, so that the speed is not constant. English astronomer James Bradley discovered the nutation of Earth's axis in 1728.

Earth

Nutation subtly changes the axial tilt of Earth with respect to the ecliptic plane, shifting the major circles of latitude that are defined by the Earth's tilt (the tropical circles and the polar circles).

In the case of Earth, the principal sources of tidal force are the Sun and Moon, which continuously change location relative to each other and thus cause nutation in Earth's axis. The largest component of Earth's nutation has a period of 18.6 years, the same as that of the precession of the Moon's orbital nodes. However, there are other significant periodic terms that must be accounted for depending upon the desired accuracy of the result. A mathematical description (set of equations) that represents nutation is called a "theory of nutation". In the theory, parameters are adjusted in a more or less ad hoc method to obtain the best fit to data. Simple rigid body dynamics do not give the best theory; one has to account for deformations of the Earth, including mantle inelasticity and changes in the core–mantle boundary.

The principal term of nutation is due to the regression of the Moon's nodal line and has the same period of 6798 days (18.61 years). It reaches plus or minus 17″ in longitude and 9.2″ in obliquity. All other terms are much smaller; the next-largest, with a period of 183 days (0.5 year), has amplitudes 1.3″ and 0.6″ respectively. The periods of all terms larger than 0.0001″ (about as accurately as available technology can measure) lie between 5.5 and 6798 days; for some reason (as with ocean tidal periods) they seem to avoid the range from 34.8 to 91 days, so it is customary to split the nutation into long-period and short-period terms. The long-period terms are calculated and mentioned in the almanacs, while the additional correction due to the short-period terms is usually taken from a table. They can also be calculated from the Julian day according to IAU 2000B methodology.

In popular culture

In the 1961 disaster film The Day the Earth Caught Fire, the near-simultaneous detonation of two super-hydrogen bombs near the poles causes a change in Earth's nutation, as well as an 11° shift in the axial tilt and a change in Earth's orbit around the Sun. 

In Star Trek: The Next Generation, rapidly 'cycling' or 'changing' the 'shield nutation' is frequently mentioned as a means by which to delay the antagonist in their efforts to break through the defences and pillage the Enterprise or other spacecraft.

See also
 Libration
 Teetotum

Notes

References

The Feynman Lectures on Physics Vol. I Ch. 20: Rotation in space

Rotation in three dimensions
Astrometry
Geodynamics